The 1899 Detroit College Tigers football team  was an American football team that represented Detroit College (renamed the University of Detroit in 1911) as an independent during the 1899 college football season. In its fourth season under head coach William S. Robinson, the team compiled a 5–1–1 record and outscored its opponents by a combined total of 101 to 15.  The team's sole loss came against the Detroit Athletic Club reserves.  Its victories were against Detroit School for Boys, Detroit Central High School, Detroit Monroe High School, Gutchess Business College and the Detroit Alumni.

Schedule

References

Detroit College Tigers
Detroit Titans football seasons
College football undefeated seasons
Detroit College Tigers football
Detroit College Tigers football